Kamikawa is the name of several places in Japan:
 Kamikawa Subprefecture, one of 14 subprefectures in Hokkaidō
 Kamikawa (Ishikari) District, Hokkaidō, a district in Kamikawa Subprefecture
 Kamikawa (Teshio) District, Hokkaidō, a district in Kamikawa Subprefecture
 Kamikawa (Tokachi) District, Hokkaidō, a district in Tokachi Subprefecture
 Kamikawa, Hokkaidō, a town in Kamikawa (Ishikari) District, Kamikawa Subprefecture, Hokkaidō
 Kamikawa, Hyōgo, a town in Hyōgo Prefecture
 Kamikawa, Niigata, a village in Niigata Prefecture
 Kamikawa, Saitama, a town in Saitama Prefecture

See also
 Japanese seaplane tender Kamikawa Maru